Andreas Otto (born 5 October 1963) is a German boxer. He competed at the 1988 Summer Olympics and the 1992 Summer Olympics. At the 1988 Summer Olympics, he lost to Howard Grant of Canada.

References

External links
 

1963 births
Living people
German male boxers
Olympic boxers of East Germany
Olympic boxers of Germany
Boxers at the 1988 Summer Olympics
Boxers at the 1992 Summer Olympics
Sportspeople from Frankfurt (Oder)
AIBA World Boxing Championships medalists
Light-welterweight boxers